The Indo-Parthian Kingdom was a Parthian kingdom founded by Gondophares, and active from 19 CE to c. 226 CE. At their zenith, they ruled an area covering parts of eastern Iran, various parts of Afghanistan and the northwest regions of the Indian subcontinent (most of modern Pakistan and parts of northwestern India). The rulers may have been members of the  House of Suren, and the kingdom has even been called the "Suren Kingdom" by some authors.

The kingdom was founded in 19/20 when the governor of Drangiana (Sakastan) Gondophares declared independence from the Parthian Empire. He would later make expeditions to the east, conquering territory from the Indo-Scythians and Indo-Greeks, thus transforming his kingdom into an empire. The domains of the Indo-Parthians were greatly reduced following the invasions of the Kushans in the second half of the 1st. century. They managed to retain control of Sakastan, until its conquest by the Sasanian Empire in c. 224/5. In Baluchistan, the Paratarajas, a local Indo-Parthian dynasty, fell into the orbit of the Sasanian Empire circa 262 CE.

The Indo-Parthians are noted for the construction of the Buddhist monastery Takht-i-Bahi (UNESCO World Heritage Site) in Mardan, Pakistan.

Gondophares I and his successors

Gondophares I originally seems to have been a ruler of Seistan in what is today eastern Iran, probably a vassal or relative of the Apracarajas. He may have replaced previous Parthian governors of Seistan, such as Cheiroukes or Tanlismaidates. These Parthian satraps had been ruling the region of Sakastan since the time when Mithridates II (124–88 BC) had vanquished the Sakas of the region.

Around 20–10 BC, he made conquests in the former Indo-Scythian kingdom, perhaps after the death of the important ruler Azes. Gondophares became the ruler of areas comprising Arachosia, Seistan, Sindh, Punjab, and the Kabul valley, but it does not seem as though he held territory beyond eastern Punjab. Gondophares called himself "King of Kings", a Parthian title that in his case correctly reflects that the Indo-Parthian empire was only a loose framework: a number of smaller dynasts certainly maintained their positions during the Indo-Parthian period, likely in exchange for their recognition of Gondophares and his successors. These smaller dynasts included the Apracarajas themselves, and Indo-Scythian satraps such as Zeionises and Rajuvula, as well as anonymous Scythians who struck imitations of Azes coins. The Ksaharatas also held sway in Gujarat, perhaps just outside Gondophares' dominions.

After the death of Gondophares I, the empire started to fragment. The name or title Gondophares was adapted by Sarpedones, who become Gondophares II and was possibly son of the first Gondophares. Even though he claimed to be the main ruler, Sarpedones’ rule was shaky and he issued a fragmented coinage in Sind, eastern Punjab and Arachosia in southern Afghanistan. The most important successor was Abdagases, Gondophares’ nephew, who ruled in Punjab and possibly in the homeland of Seistan. After a short reign, Sarpedones seems to have been succeeded by Orthagnes, who became Gondophares III Gadana. Orthagnes ruled mostly in Seistan and Arachosia, with Abdagases further east, during the first decades AD, and was briefly succeeded by his son Ubouzanes Coin. After 20 AD, a king named Sases, a nephew of the Apracaraja ruler Aspavarma, took over Abdagases’ territories and became Gondophares IV Sases. According to Senior, this is the Gondophares referred to in the Takht-i-Bahi inscription.

There were other minor kings: Sanabares was an ephemeral usurper in Seistan, who called himself Great King of Kings, and there was also a second Abdagases Coin, a ruler named Agata in Sind, another ruler called Satavastres Coin, and an anonymous prince who claimed to be brother of the king Arsaces, in that case an actual member of the ruling dynasty in Parthia.

But the Indo-Parthians never regained the position of Gondophares I, and from the middle of the 1st century AD the Kushans under Kujula Kadphises began absorbing the northern Indian part of the kingdom.

Rulers of Turan and Sakastan (160-230 AD)

The Indo-Parthians managed to retain control of Turan and Sakastan, which they ruled until the fall of the Parthian Empire at the hands of the Sasanian Empire circa 230 CE. Pahares I (160-230 AD) was a ruler of Turan following the partition of the remains of the Indo-Parthian kingdom. The kingdom of Sakastan was ruled by a second king with the name Sanabares II (160-175 AD). The Kingdoms of Turan and Sakastan ended when they submitted to the Sasanian ruler Ardeshir I circa 230 CE. These events were recorded by Al-Tabari, describing the arrival of envoys to Ardeshir at Gor:

Archaeology and sources

The city of Taxila is thought to have been a capital of the Indo-Parthians. Large strata were excavated by Sir John Marshall with a quantity of Parthian-style artifacts. The nearby temple of Jandial is usually interpreted as a Zoroastrian fire temple from the period of the Indo-Parthians.

Some ancient writings describe the presence of the Indo-Parthians in the area, such as the story of Saint Thomas the Apostle, who was recruited as a carpenter to serve at the court of king "Gudnaphar" (thought to be Gondophares) in India. The Acts of Thomas describes in chapter 17 Thomas' visit to king Gudnaphar in northern India; chapters 2 and 3 depict him as embarking on a sea voyage to India, thus connecting Thomas to the west coast of India.

As Senior points out, this Gudnaphar has usually been identified with the first Gondophares, who has thus been dated after the advent of Christianity, but there is no evidence for this assumption, and Senior's research shows that Gondophares I could be dated even before 1 AD. If the account is even historical, Saint Thomas may have encountered one of the later kings who bore the same title.

The Greek philosopher Apollonius of Tyana is related by Philostratus in Life of Apollonius Tyana to have visited India, and specifically the city of Taxila around 46 AD. He describes constructions of the Greek type,
probably referring to Sirkap, and explains that the Indo-Parthian king of Taxila, named Phraotes, received a Greek education at the court of his father and spoke Greek fluently:

The Periplus of the Erythraean Sea is a surviving 1st century guide to the routes commonly being used for navigating the Arabian Sea. It describes the presence of Parthian kings fighting with each other in the area of Sindh, a region traditionally known at that time as "Scythia" due to the previous rule of the Indo-Scythians there:

"This river (Indus) has seven mouths, very shallow and marshy, so that they are not navigable, except the one in the middle; at which by the shore, is the market-town, Barbaricum. Before it there lies a small island, and inland behind it is the metropolis of Scythia, Minnagara; it is subject to Parthian princes who are constantly driving each other out." Periplus of the Erythraean Sea, Chap 38

An inscription from Takht-i-Bahi bears two dates, one in the regnal year 26 of the Maharaja Guduvhara (again thought to be a Gondophares), and the year 103 of an unknown era.

Religion of the Indo-Parthians

We do not know the religion of the House of Suren although we know they were in religious conflict with the Zoroastrian Arsacid Dynasty. Unlike the Indo-Greeks or Indo-Scythians, there are no explicit records of Indo-Parthian rulers supporting Buddhism, such as religious dedications, inscriptions, or even legendary accounts. Also, although Indo-Parthian coins generally closely follow Greek numismatics, they never display the Buddhist triratna symbol (apart from the later Sases), nor do they ever use depictions of the elephant or the bull, possible religious symbols which were profusely used by their predecessors. They are thought to have retained Zoroastrianism, being of Iranian extraction themselves. This Iranian mythological system was inherited from them by the later Kushans who ruled from the Peshawar-Khyber-Pakhtunkhwa region of Pakistan.

Coins of the Hindu deity Shiva have also been found issued in the reign of Gondophares I.

Representation of Indo-Parthian devotees

On their coins and in the art of Gandhara, Indo-Parthians are depicted with short crossover jackets and large baggy trousers, possibly supplemented by chap-like over-trousers. Their jackets are adorned with rows of decorative rings or medals. Their hair is usually bushy and contained with a headband, a practise largely adopted by the Parthians from the 1st century AD.

Individuals in Indo-Parthian attire are sometimes shown as actors in Buddhist devotional scenes. It is usually considered that most of the excavations that were done at Sirkap near Taxila by John Marshall relate to Indo-Parthian layers, although more recent scholarship sometimes relates them to the Indo-Greeks instead. These archaeological researches provided a quantity of Hellenistic artifacts combined with elements of Buddhist worship (stupas). Some other temples, such as nearby Jandial may have been used as a Zoroastrian fire temple.

Buddhist sculptures
The statues found at Sirkap in the late Scythian to Parthian level (level 2, 1–60 AD) suggest an already developed state of Gandharan art at the time or even before Parthian rule. A multiplicity of statues, ranging from Hellenistic gods, to various Gandharan lay devotees, are combined with what are thought as some of the early representations of the Buddha and Bodhisattvas. Today, it is still unclear when the Greco-Buddhist art of Gandhara exactly emerged, but the findings in Sirkap do indicate that this art was already highly developed before the advent of the Kushans.

Stone palettes

Numerous stone palettes found in Gandhara are considered as good representatives of Indo-Parthian art. These palettes combine Greek and Persian influences, together with a frontality in representations which is considered as characteristic of Parthian art. Such palettes have only been found in archaeological layers corresponding to Indo-Greek, Indo-Scythian and Indo-Parthian rule, and are essentially unknown the preceding Mauryan layers or the succeeding Kushan layers.

Very often these palettes represent people in Greek dress in mythological scenes, but a few of them represent people in Parthian dress (head-bands over bushy hair, crossed-over jacket on a bare chest, jewelry, belt, baggy trousers). A palette from the Naprstek Museum in Prague shows an Indo-Parthian king seated crossed-legged on a large sofa, surrounded by two attendants also in Parthian dress. They are shown drinking and serving wine.

Silk Road transmission of Buddhism

Some pockets of Parthian rule remained in the East, even after the takeover by the Sassanids in 226. From the 2nd century several Central-Asian Buddhist missionaries appeared in the Chinese capital cities of Loyang and sometimes Nanjing, where they particularly distinguished themselves by their translation work. The first known translators of Buddhist texts into Chinese are actually Parthian missionaries, distinguished in Chinese by their Parthian surname "An", for "Anshi", "country of the Arsacids".
An Shih Kao, was a Parthian prince, who made the first known translations of Hinayana Buddhist texts into Chinese (148–170).
An Hsuan, was a Parthian merchant who became a monk in China 181 AD.
Tan-ti (c. 254), a Parthian monk.
An Fajin (281–306), a monk of Parthian origins.

Main Indo-Parthian rulers

 Gondophares I (c. 19 – 46) Coin
 Gondophares II Sarpedones (first years AD – c. 20 AD)Coin
 Abdagases I (first years AD – mid-1st century AD) Coin
 Gondophares III Gudana, previously Orthagnes (c. 20 AD – 30 AD)
 Gondophares IV Sases, (mid-1st century AD)
 Ubouzanes, (late-1st century AD)
 Pacores (late 1st century AD) Coin

See also 
 Indo-Greek Kingdom
 Indo-Sasanians
 Indo-Scythians
 Kushan Empire
 Yuezhi
 Pahlavas
 Kambojas

Notes

References

Sources

External links 

 Coins of the Indo-Parthians
 History of Greco-India

Parthian Empire
 
10s establishments
220s disestablishments
1st-century BC establishments
States and territories established in the 1st century BC
States and territories disestablished in the 2nd century
Former kingdoms